Greenwood (2016 population 665) is a city in south central British Columbia. It was incorporated in 1897 and was formerly one of the principal cities of the Boundary Country smelting and mining district. It was incorporated as a city originally and has retained that title despite the population decline following the closure of the area's industries.

The town is served by Greenwood Elementary School which covers grades from K-7. Following grade 7 local students attend Boundary Central Secondary School in nearby Midway.

In 1942, 1,200 Japanese Canadians were sent to Greenwood as part of the Japanese Canadian internment. Among those interned at Greenwood were Isamu and Fumiko Kariya and their son Yasi, the grandparents and uncle of NHL star and Hockey Hall of Fame member Paul Kariya; his father Tetsuhiko (T.K.) was born in internment.

History 

In 1886 several mining claims had been staked in a narrow gulch ten miles north of the mouth of Boundary Creek. The ore was high in copper. Ten years later more claims had been staked in the area. These claims gave rise to the city of Greenwood. In 1895 a merchant named Robert Wood erected a log store and named the region Greenwood.

By 1896 there were three hotels, a general store, a livery stable, two assay offices, a mining broker, an opera house, and a dozen other establishments. Greenwood became an incorporated city in 1897. The population climbed to 3,000 by 1899 and a railway called the Columbia and Western Railway reached Greenwood from the east. In 1899 a fire struck Greenwood which gutted several businesses.

The BC Copper Company smelter began operation in 1901, servicing ore from the Mother Lode Mine and other mines in the area. Greenwood was the supply center for surrounding camps such as Providence, Copper, Deadwood, Wellington, Central, Skylark and others. The city became the seat of government for the Boundary with one hundred firms in the business district. Greenwood had a newspaper called the "Times" by 1906 another paper called the "Greenwood Ledge".

By 1910 the boom had passed and Greenwood's population was 1,500. At the end of World War I, the demand for copper dropped, and by 1918 the copper market was dead, and the smelter in Greenwood lay idle. The following year it closed down permanently. The collapse of the smelters led to close of mines around the vicinity of Greenwood. Greenwood was on the decline after this period.

Lost mines
Close to Greenwood is the location of Jolly Jack's Lost Mine. Local historian Bill Barlee wrote about Jolly Jack's lost mine. The location of the mine was never found. The Greenwood local museum has written records of Jolly Jack.

Henry Morgan's lost mine is located somewhere around Greenwood. The mine is thought to have been at the headwaters of Boundary Creek, although it has never been found. Local historian Garnet Basque has written about Morgan's lost mine.

Demographics 

Arts and culture 
Greenwood was featured on the historical television series Gold Trails and Ghost Towns, Season 2, Episode 1. Greenwood was one of the filming locations for the theatrical film Snow Falling on Cedars. It was also featured as a town named after the fictional logging magnate of Everett Greenwood in the 2019 Michael Christie novel Greenwood.

See also
Boundary Creek Times

References

External links 

Cities in British Columbia
Populated places in the Boundary Country
Mining communities in British Columbia
Internment of Japanese Canadians
World War II internment camps in Canada